Erna Paris  (6 May 1938 – 3 February 2022) was a Canadian non-fiction author.

Biography
Paris was born in Toronto to an essentially secular Jewish family. She was the niece of classical pianist Beth Lipkin. After earning a Bachelor of Arts degree from the University of Toronto in Honours Philosophy and English, Paris moved to France for several years, where she continued her studies at the Sorbonne. She began her writing career in the 1970s as a magazine journalist and radio broadcaster/documentarist.

She was the author of seven books and the winner of twelve national and international prizes for her books, journalism, and radio documentaries. She was also a frequent contributor to the opinion page of the Globe and Mail.

Paris lived in Toronto with her husband, Thomas M. Robinson, professor emeritus of Ancient Greek Philosophy and Classics at the University of Toronto. She had a daughter, Michelle, and a son, Roland. Paris died on 3 February 2022, at the age of 83.

Awards and recognition
 1970: Winner, Media Club of Canada, feature writing
 1973: Winner, Media Club of Canada, radio documentary
 1974: Winner, Media Club of Canada, feature writing
 1974: Winner, Media Club of Canada, radio documentary
 1981-2001, Now magazine Best Books, Long Shadows: Truth, Lies and History
 1983: Winner, Gold Medal, National Magazine Awards
 1990: Best Canadian Essays, Fifth House Press, The Boat People
 1991: Winner, Bronze Medal The White Award, North America City and Regional Magazine Competition, The Boat People
 1995: Winner, Year-End Best Books, Quill & Quire, The End of Days: Tolerance,    Tyranny and the Expulsion of the Jews from Spain
 1996: Winner, Canadian Jewish Book Awards, History, The End of Days: Tolerance, Tyranny and the Expulsion of the Jews from Spain
 2000: Globe and Mail Best Books, Long Shadows: Truth, Lies and History
 2001: Winner, Pearson Writers' Trust Non-Fiction Prize, Long Shadows: Truth, Lies and History
 2001: Winner, Shaughnessy Cohen Prize for Political Writing, Long Shadows: Truth, Lies and History
 2001: Winner, Dorothy Shoichet Prize for History, Canadian Jewish Book Awards, Long Shadows: Truth, Lies and History 
 2001: The Christian Science Monitor Best Books, Long Shadows: Truth, Lies and History
 2001: New Statesman Best Books, Long Shadows: Truth, Lies and History
 2002: Visiting Fellow, International Affairs Program, University of Colorado Boulder
 2003: "The Presence of Excellence/ Vingt-Cinq Ans d'Excellence: Twenty-Five Years of Selections from the National Magazine Awards", National Magazine Awards Foundation
 2005: "The 100 Most Important Canadian Books Ever Written" (1535-2004): Long Shadows: Truth, Lies and History, The Literary Review of Canada
 2008: The Globe and Mail Best Books, "The Sun Climbs Slow: Justice in the Age of Imperial America"
 2008-2009: Vice Chair, Writers' Union of Canada
 2009: Short-List, Shaughnessy Cohen Prize for Political Writing, "The Sun Climbs Slow: Justice in the Age of Imperial America"
 2009: "Decade in Review: Top 10 Canadian Books", "Long Shadows: Truth, Lies and History," Now magazine
 2009: Appointed, Honorary Council, Canadian Centre for International Justice, Ottawa
 2009-2010: Chair, Writers' Union of Canada
 2011: "Canada's Twenty-Five Most Influential Books of Nonfiction", "Long Shadows: Truth, Lies and History", selected by the shortlisted authors for the Hilary Weston Writers' Trust Prize for Nonfiction
 2012: World Federalist Movement-Canada World Peace Award
 2012: Winner, Silver Medal, National Magazine Awards
 2014: "2014 Alumni of Influence", University College, University of Toronto
 2015: Appointed a Member of the Order of Canada

Bibliography
 Jews, An Account of Their Experience in Canada. Toronto: Macmillan, 1980. 
 Stepfamilies: Making Them Work. Toronto: Avon, 1984. 
 Unhealed Wounds: France and the Klaus Barbie Affair. Toronto: Methuen, 1985. 
 The Garden and the Gun: A Journey Inside Israel. Toronto: Lester & Orpen Dennys, 1988 
 The End of Days: A Story of Tolerance, Tyranny, and the Expulsion of the Jews from Spain. Toronto: Lester, 1995. 
 Long Shadows: Truth, Lies and History Toronto: Knopf Canada, 2000. 
 The Sun Climbs Slow: Justice in the Age of Imperial America, Toronto: Knopf Canada, 2008. 
 From Tolerance to Tyranny: A Cautionary Tale From Fifteenth-Century Spain, Toronto: Cormorant Books, 2015.  (New edition of The End of Days.)

References

External links
Erna Paris official website, accessed 17 July 2006
University of Toronto Magazine: Alumni Notes, Autumn 2001, "Kudos", accessed 17 July 2006

1930s births
2022 deaths
20th-century Canadian historians
Jewish Canadian writers
Writers from Toronto
University of Paris alumni
University of Toronto alumni
21st-century Canadian historians
Members of the Order of Canada
Canadian women historians